Kepler-19c is an extra-solar planet orbiting the star Kepler-19 approximately 717 light years from Earth.

Discovery
The planet was discovered as a result of examinations of data from the previously discovered exoplanet, Kepler-19b.  Timing variations in the orbital period of the first planet necessitated  gravitational forces to be acting upon the planet, resulting from an additional body in the vicinity, acting to cause a variation of transition of five minutes per orbit. The lead author of the paper announcing the discovery was Sarah Ballard.

See also
List of extrasolar planet firsts

References

External links
 Ames research 12:21

Exoplanets discovered in 2011
19c